The Moscow Automobile Ring Road, or MKAD, is a ring road running predominantly on the city border of Moscow with a length of 108.9 km (67.7 mi) and 35 exits (including ten interchanges). It was completed in 1962. The speed limit is 100 km/h.

History
The growth of traffic in and around Moscow in the 1950s made the city planners realise Russia's largest metropolis needed a bypass to redirect incoming traffic from major roads that run through the city. Opened in 1961, the MKAD had four lanes of asphalt running 108.9 kilometres along the city borders.

For a long time the MKAD served as the administrative boundary of Moscow city, until in the 1980s Moscow started annexing territory outside the beltway. In December 2002 Bulvar Dmitriya Donskogo became the first Moscow Metro station that opened beyond the limits of MKAD.

In 1995–1999, the road was widened from the initial four to ten lanes, while all intersections became grade-separated, bridges were built to accommodate pedestrians, traffic lights were removed, and a solid concrete barrier was installed in the median. In 2001, all slow-moving vehicles were banned from entering the MKAD, and the renovated road received a freeway designation from the mayor's office.

Route

Gallery

See also

Ring roads in Moscow:
 Boulevard Ring
 Garden Ring
 Third Ring Road
 Central Ring Road

Comparison to other ring roads encircling big cities:
 Saint Petersburg Ring Road
 Ring roads of Beijing
 London Orbital motorway
 Washington, DC Beltway
 A23 in Vienna
 Boulevard Périphérique and Paris super-périphérique in Paris
 Grande Raccordo Anulare in Rome
 Autopista de Circunvalación M-40 and M-50 (Spain) in Madrid
 Tokyo Central Circular Expressway, Tokyo Outer Expressway, and four other regular roads, encircling Tokyo
 Express Ring Road in Warsaw
 Minsk Ring Road

Notes and references

External links 

 The MKAD on Google Maps.
 A view of the MKAD from a pedestrian bridge.

Geography of Moscow
Ring roads in Moscow
Transport in Moscow